The 2015 NWSL Expansion Draft was a special draft held on November 2, 2015 by the National Women's Soccer League to allow  expansion side Orlando Pride to select players from existing teams in the league.  The Pride were allowed to select up to ten players total from the existing nine NWSL teams from a list of unprotected players previously provided by the clubs.

Format
 2015 playoff teams (Chicago Red Stars, FC Kansas City, Seattle Reign FC and Washington Spirit) were allowed to protect up to 9 players, and 2015 non-playoff teams (Boston Breakers, Houston Dash, Portland Thorns FC, Sky Blue FC and Western New York Flash) up to 10.
 Clubs with more than two U.S. allocated players could protect up to two of them; the remaining allocated players would be left unprotected. 
 The Pride were allowed to pick up to two players from any existing team, or just one if they selected a US allocated player.
 The Pride were allowed to pick no more than two US allocated players total.
 When an existing club loses a player, they may protect one of their remaining unprotected players.
 Eligible players included those left unprotected by their club encompassing:
Any current NWSL players including U.S., Mexican and Canadian allocated players
Any unsigned player who was previously claimed via waivers 
Any player that has been loaned to a club outside the NWSL
Any player whose rights are held by a specific team
 Players on a team’s Discovery List were not eligible to be selected by the Pride.

Expansion draft results
The following players were selected by the Orlando Pride during the Expansion Draft on Monday, November 2, 2015.

On October 26, 2015, it was announced that the expansion Orlando Pride had trade the #1 pick in the 2015 NWSL Expansion Draft as well as the #1 pick in the 2016 NWSL College Draft and an international roster spot for the 2016 and 2017 seasons to the Portland Thorns FC in exchange for USA star forward Alex Morgan and Canadian midfielder Kaylyn Kyle.

Team-by-team breakdown

Bold indicates a player was selected in the expansion draft
Blue highlights indicate US allocated players
^Indicates a player that was protected after a teammate had been drafted

Boston Breakers

Chicago Red Stars

Houston Dash

FC Kansas City

Portland Thorns FC

Seattle Reign FC

Sky Blue FC

Washington Spirit

Western New York Flash

See also
List of NWSL drafts
2016 National Women's Soccer League season

References

External links
Official draft procedures release
League list of protected and unprotected players

National Women's Soccer League drafts
2016 National Women's Soccer League season
Orlando Pride
NWSL Expansion Draft